Mary Felicia Perera (born June 7, 1944, සෝනියා දිසා) [Sinhala]), popularly as Sonia Dissanayake or known professionally as Sonia Disa, is a former actress in Sri Lankan cinema. Starting her career in 1962, Disa became one of the most popular film actresses in Sri Lanka in the 1970s and 1980s. Apart from acting, she also produced 17 films and worked as a costume designer.

Personal life
Disa was born on 7 June 1944 in Kotahena, Colombo as Mary Felicia Perera. She was married to Karu Dissanayake, who was also a film actor and made his film debut with Soorayangeth Sooraya, later acting in popular films including Weli Kathara, Thushara and Janaka Saha Manju. He died on 17 November 2009. Disa lives in Australia with her two children, Udaya and Harshani, and her three grandchildren.

In 2017, Sonia was hospitalized due to a sudden heart attack. She recovered successfully after surgery.

Career
Disa was introduced to cinema by Anthony C. Perera at the age of 19. He brought Sonia into Titus Thotawatte and she acted as "club girl" in his 1962 film Chandiya.  Her major cinematic breakthrough came through a supporting role in the 1964 film Heta Pramada Wadi, directed by Shantha Kumar Senevirathna. Some of her most popular films are Soorayangeth Sooraya, Thusara, Sadahatama Oba Magai and Janaka Saha Manju.

During the shooting of 1976 film Nedeyo, Sonia was severely injured when acting a scene in a car. She was admitted to the hospital in a comatose state and relieved after seven days. One of her eyes was severely damaged and the vision was lost in that eye. It took one year and six months for her to recover completely. Disa won the Best Supporting Actress award for her role in Obata Divura Kiyannam at Sarasavi Film Festival and Best Supporting Actress award for her role in Devduwa at the Presidential award festival.

Disa acted with Gamini Fonseka in 15 films, which enabled her to play in different levels in Sinhalese cinema. She acted in many villainous roles opposite Malini Fonseka. She then started to act in more dramatic roles which commenced with Jeewana Ganga directed by Dayananda Rodrigo. Finally, she was acted in many motherly roles in blockbuster movies such as Thaththai Puthai, Raja Wadakarayo, Hitha Honda Chandiya and Mamai Raja. With many western roles, her name was transferred to stage name Sonia Disa by Tissa Abeysekara.

In 1986, she produced her maiden cinema production Jaya Apatai along with Sunil T. Fernando.

In 2004, Disa celebrated 40 years of her cinema career with a grand ceremony at the BMICH. After 20 years, she acted in Dayaratne Ratagedara's poya day single episode teledrama Mudukku.

Arrest
16 February 2015, Disa was arrested by the Slave Island police for trespassing on the Nava Sama Samaja Party office premises at Barrack road Colombo 2. She charged that her house was unlawfully acquired by Wickramabahu Karunaratne. She also stated that the building was given to former minister Vasudeva Nanayakkara twenty years ago. However, six people including Disa, were produced before the Fort Magistrate Court. She was released on bail by the Colombo Fort Magistrate’s Court on 18 February 2015.

Filmography

As actress

As producer

As costume designer

References

External links
 “Actresses Always Took Advantage Of Me..” - Sunil T
 Sonia turns 75 in style
 සෝනියා දිසා ගේ රෝහල් බිල ගෙවීමේ අර්බූදයක

Living people
Sri Lankan film actresses
1944 births
Sri Lankan film producers
Sinhalese actresses